The lesser slender salamander (Batrachoseps minor) is a species of salamander in the family Plethodontidae.

Distribution
The lesser slender salamander is endemic to California, in San Luis Obispo County in the western United States.

This salamander's natural habitat is in the chaparral and woodlands and temperate coniferous forests in the southern end of the California Coast Ranges.

References

External links
IUCN: all species searchpage

Batrachoseps
Salamander
Salamander
Fauna of the California chaparral and woodlands
Natural history of San Luis Obispo County, California
Taxonomy articles created by Polbot
Amphibians described in 1998